Bobby Elliot Roache (born May 1, 1982) is an American male model and actor. Bobby established himself among the top most recognisable and in-demand models for his appearance role as Beyoncé's love interest in the #1 hit Irreplaceable.

Biography
Bobby Roache was born on June 16, 1982 in Georgia. He and Art ala Carte both became known for their artistry displayed in YouTube videos. He was home-schooled his whole life. He began his channel with a video called “How to carve a relief style plaque” which was published in December 2011 and did not become an instant hit.

Personal life
Bobby Roache was awarded most academic and best personality in his high school yearbook. In 2010, First Lady Michelle Obama was gifted print piece titled "Eyes On Music" a series of Roaché's art tribute for Duke Ellington School of the Arts. He launched his retail collection in Summer 2014. In his free time, he continues designing, drawing, painting, print-making, and sculpting pieces.

Filmography

References
 Forbes Interview https://www.forbes.com/video/3755958950001/
 Rolling Out http://rollingout.com/lifestyle/style/close-up-with-model-bobby-roache/
 Jones Magazine https://web.archive.org/web/20110207230342/http://jonesmag.com/fashion/gucci-model-bobby-roache-is-jonesmag-coms-april-eye-candy/
 Jillz Cider https://www.youtube.com/watch?v=8R_wS6ku4Qc
 Polaroid Eyewear https://web.archive.org/web/20120209121928/http://www.polaroid-eyewearstore.com/news/22/Rip-the-Runway---Red-Carpet-Rundown.html
 Madame Noire http://madamenoire.com/40286/bobby-roache-is-looking-for-love/
 The Bahamas Weekly http://www.thebahamasweekly.com/publish/new-providence-bahamas/Here_s_your_chancesupermodel_Bobby_Roache10484.shtml

Male models from Georgia (U.S. state)
Living people
1982 births
African-American male models
21st-century African-American people
20th-century African-American people